The Battle of Cagayan de Misamis was fought on April 7, 1900, in the town of Cagayan de Misamis (now Cagayan de Oro) in Mindanao, Philippines, during the Philippine–American War. The Filipinos were under the command of General Nicolas Capistrano.

The surprise dawn attack was foiled when one of the lumad (ethnic minority) warriors shouted a battle cry as he killed an American sentry that aroused the American soldiers. The fighting was centered on the town plaza (now Gaston Park) where the American barracks were located.

General Capistrano, foreseeing imminent defeat, ordered the retreat of his men. The Americans pursued General Capistrano and his men to the edge of the town.

See also 

 Battle of Makahambus Hill
 Cagayan de Oro
 1582 Cagayan battles

References 

Conflicts in 1900
1900 in the Philippines
Battles of the Philippine–American War
Battles involving the United States
Military history of the Philippines
History of Misamis Oriental
Cagayan de Oro
April 1900 events